Lite Shipping Corporation, is a Cebu City-based shipping line, that operates the Lite Ferries, a brand consisting of a fleet of more than 20 ships. The corporation has its origins from Bohol, and is the flagship company of Lite Holdings, Inc. At present, the corporation also owns and manages Danilo Lines, Inc. and Sunline Shipping Corporation.

History 
The company was a wholly owned subsidiary of Lirio Enterprises, Inc., a general trading firm doing business nationwide. It started as a shipping division of the mother company in the middle of 1988 when it bought two vessels - the MV Sto. Niño de Soledad, a 500-ton DWT capacity steel-hulled vessel and the MV Sto. Niño, a wooden hull 200-ton capacity vessel. Initially, the cargo loaded was mostly goods traded by Lirio Enterprises, Inc. like salt, rice, cement, fertilizers, sugar, etc. Sometimes they would accept other cargoes for backload when the occasion demands it. This shipping division was spun off as a separate shipping corporation in July 1989 when the Philippine Securities and Exchange Commission approved the Articles of Incorporation and by-laws of Lite Shipping Corporation.

The Lite Shipping Corporation fleet then consisted of 15 roll-on/roll-off vessels, 12 passenger vessels and 3 cargo ships. In November 1991, the corporation acquired its third vessel, the MV St. Gabriel, a steel-hulled 30-ton capacity cargo boat due to the strong demand for the smaller cargo vessel in the trading operation of the mother company.  In January 1992, the company expanded into the cargo/passenger shipping business with the purchase of a 175 gross-ton roro car/truck carrier from the U.S. Navy, the LCT St. Mark. It has a capacity of four ten-wheeler cargo trucks, five cars and 50 to 70 passengers. It is the franchise holder for the Argao, Cebu to Loon, Bohol route as a daily car/truck ferry.

In November 2019 Lite Shipping Corporation bought the now-defunct George and Peter Lines it took over their routes and acquiring its vessels

Lite Shipping Corporation to Lite Ferries 
In 2010, the Lite Shipping Corporation launched a new corporate brand name, along with a more contemporary and dynamic company logo, for all its vessels, now known as the Lite Ferries.

Lite Holdings, Inc. 
Lite Holdings, Inc. was formed as a Holding Company with the following corporations under its umbrella: 
 Lite Shipping Corporation also owns and manages Danilo Lines, Inc. and Sunline Shipping Corporation. The management team is headed by COO Engr. Fernando A. Inting and OIC Jonathan Lim-Imboy; 
 Cebu Lite Trading, Inc. was established in 1991 as a distributor of local cement brands and is also engaged in the importation of rice from Vietnam and Thailand as well as a major cement importer. The OIC for Cebu Lite Trading is Rowena Imboy-Lim. 
 Lirio Shipping Lines, Inc. started only recently, and is led by Raymund Lim-Revilles as the OIC and he has steered the company into a major provider of LCT barges for the Mining Industry. They are also into Ship Management. 
 Lite Properties Corporation is the latest venture of Lite Holdings Group and is engaged in real estate development particularly economic and low cost housing as well as strip mall development in Cebu and in Bohol. OIC for Lite Properties is Atty. Dominique D. Lim and ably assisted by Rochelle Brigitte Lim-Imboy. 
 Lou's Square Development Corporation operates the hotel and restaurant business of Soledad Suites in Tagbilaran City as well as Casa Filomena Resort in Panglao and Pamilacan Island Paradise, all in Bohol where the Lim Family traces their roots.

Fleet

Present 
As of April 2021, Lite Ferries have 28 ferries that are ROPAXes plus 2 Cargo RORO LCTs (LF 26 and LF 28). 
 M/V Lite Ferry 1 (IMO 7005530)
 She was the M/V Danilo 1 of Danilo Lines, Inc., before the company was acquired by Lite Shipping Corporation.
 M/V Lite Ferry 2
 A sister ship of the M/V Lite Ferry 1, she was the M/V Danilo 2 of Danilo Lines, Inc., before the company was acquired by Lite Shipping Corporation.
 M/V Lite Ferry 3 
 The current Lite Ferry 3 was acquired in 2006 as the former Noumi No.8 in Japan, later becoming the second Santiago de Bohol in the Lite Ferries fleet. She is the smallest fleet in the Lite Ferries.
 M/V Lite Ferry Five 
A brand new ship made in China.
 M/V Lite Ferry 6 (formerly M/V San Jose de Tagbilaran)
 Acquired by Lite Ferries in 2004 as the Salve Juliana of the MBRS Shipping Lines of Romblon. Her sister ships are the MV Lite Ferry 1 and 2. She was built in 1971, completed in January 1972 by Nakamura Shipbuilding & Engine Works Company in the Matsue shipyard. She was first named M/V Hagi, and assigned IMO 7225477, then became M/V Salve Juliana in 1990. 
 M/V Lite Ferry 7 
 Acquired in 2005 as the former Shodoshima Maru No.1 in Japan, and Zhu Du No.2 in China, she was then known as the San Ramon de Bohol with a flat bow ramp that was later changed into a conventional pointed bow.
 M/V Lite Ferry 8
 The company's flagship, she is 75 meters long, and can carry almost 800 passengers and 18 trucks or buses. She was acquired in 2007 as the GP Ferry-1 of George & Peter Lines, formerly the M/V Santa Maria of Negros Navigation
 M/V Lite Ferry Nine 
A brand new ship made in China.
 M/V Lite Ferry 10 (formerly M/V Ocean King I)
 There were 2 vessels to be named such. The first one was a double-ended ferry, measuring 46.0 meters by 10.0 meters by 3.8 meters with a Net Tonnage of 165. She had a sister ship, the Lite Ferry 9, which was later sold by the company. LF 10 was then sold to Medallion Transport in 2011 where she became the Lady of Miraculous Medal.
 The second and present Lite Ferry 10 was the former Ocean King I of Seamarine Transport Incorporated, first acquired as a charter then later bought by the company.
 M/V Lite Ferry 11
 She was acquired by Lite Ferries along with 3 other vessels in 2010, as the Misaki No.5 of Oishi Shipping in Japan, measuring 65.7 meters by 15 meters by 3.5 meters but with a Gross Tonnage of 462.
 M/V Lite Ferry 12
 She was also acquired in 2010 from Japan, and measures 41.6 meters, a breadth of 9.6 meters, a depth of 5.6 meters and a Gross Tonnage of 249.
 M/V Lite Ferry 15
 She was also acquired in 2010 from Japan, and measures 60.3 meters length, 11.4 meters beam and a Gross Tonnage of 827 with a Net Tonnage of 562
 M/V Lite Ferry 16
 She was acquired in 2015 from Hainan Strait Shipping Company (HNSS) in China, and became a modified LCT with a car ramp at the bow and two partial decks of passenger accommodations below the bridge where one extends to near amidship which means the passenger area is far higher than the conventional LCT. She is under refitting with changing its structure
 M/V Lite Ferry 17 
 Arrived in 2016 together with her sister ship from China, she was formerly known as Bao Dao 5. 
 M/V Lite Ferry 18
 Acquired in 2016 from China, a sister ship of Lite Ferry 17, and was formerly known as Bao Dao 6 . 
 M/V Lite Ferry 19
 She was acquired in 2016 from Hainan Strait Shipping Company (HNSS) in China, and she is a sister ship of Lite Ferry 16. 
 M/V Lite Ferry 20 (formerly LCT St. Mark)
 She was one of the first few ships of the company.
 M/V Lite Ferry 21 (formerly M/V Sta. Filomena)
 Acquired in 2012 as the LCT Dona Trinidad 1 of Candano Shipping Lines in Bicol. 
 M/V Lite Ferry 22
 Acquired in 2008 as the former LCT Socor 1 of Socor Shipping Lines, she was named LCT Sto. Nino de Bohol. 
 M/V Lite Ferry 23
 She was the fourth vessel acquired in 2010, and is considered unique being a catamaran RORO that looks like an LCT from the side. She is 57.5 meters long, and 16.0 meters wide, with gross tonnage of 496.88. 
 M/V Lite Ferry 25
 She was acquired in 2012 from China, measuring 49.3 meters long and 13.8 meters wide. 
 M/V Lite Ferry 26
 She was bought from China in 2015, formerly known as the Diomicka.
 M/V Lite Ferry 27
 She was bought brand new from China in 2015, measuring 62.18 meters long and 16.8 meters wide, with a gross tonnage of 898.65. 
 M/V Lite Ferry 28
 She was bought from China in 2015 along with LF 26, and was formerly known as the Maria Dulce.
 M/V Lite Ferry 29
 She is an LCT brought a brand new from China. 
 M/V Lite Ferry 30
 An LCT (Land Craft Transport) Vessel, with IMO # 9814301, an overall length of 71.40 meters, length between perpendiculars of 56.50 meters, breadth of 16.80 meters, depth of 4.20 meters, and draft of 2.50 meters. She has 2 passenger decks, with a maximum capacity of 387 passengers (both lying and sitting accommodations). She can also accommodate a total of 4 10-wheeler trucks or 18 cars on her wagon/cargo deck.
 M/V Lite Ferry 88. The Latest Vessel Of Lite Ferry, And Their First High-Speed Catamaran Vessel.
She Is Currently Serving Cebu - Tubigon, Tubigon - Cebu Route.

 M/V GP Ferry 2. This Vessel is from the now-defunct  George & Peter Lines 
 M/V Georich. This Vessel is one of the oldest ferries in the country at 59 years old She is a cruiser that has 694 GT. This Vessel is from the now-defunct George & Peter Lines

Former 
 Lite Jet 1 - sold to Ocean Fast Ferries, Inc., renamed Ocean Jet 11
 Lite Jet 8
 Built in China, she was known as Aquan Two in Hongkong, then Nonan 2 in Vietnam, before being acquired by the company. She was later sold to Ocean Fast Ferries, Inc., then renamed as Ocean Jet 12.
 Lite Jet 9
 Built in China, she was known as Aquan One in Hongkong, then Nonan 1 in Vietnam, before being acquired together with Lite Jet 8. She was later sold to Ocean Fast Ferries, Inc., where she was renamed Ocean Jet 10.
 M/V Lite Ferry 5 (formerly M/V Our Lady of the Barangay)
 She was acquired in 2005, as the former Daishin Maru. Her dimensions were only 42.6 meters by 11.5 meters by 3.0 meters and forward part of the car deck has to be converted in Tourist accommodation to increase her passenger capacity. She was re-engined, and was later sold to a company in Palawan in 2017.

Routes 
 
Lite Shipping's main port of call is at the Port of Cebu City. She has routes to the ports of Pulauan (Dapitan), Dipolog, Larena (Siquijor), Mandaue, Ormoc, Naval (Biliran), Plaridel (Misamis Occidental), Samboan, Oslob, San Carlos (Negros Occidental), Sibulan (Negros Oriental), Tagbilaran, Toledo, Cagayan de Oro, Jagna, Tubigon, Dumaguete, Nasipit (Agusan del Norte), Bogo and Calbayog.

At present, these are the routes (and vice versa) served by Lite Ferries:
 Cebu - Cagayan de Oro
		Cebu - Calbayog (via Bogo), launched in November 2016
 Cebu-Dapitan
		Cebu - Naval, Biliran Province
		Cebu - Ormoc
 	Cebu - Larena (via Tagbilaran City)
 	Cebu - Plaridel (via Tagbilaran City and Larena)
		Cebu - Tagbilaran
 	Cebu - Tubigon
 	Toledo - San Carlos
 	Mandaue - Tubigon
 	Mandaue - Ormoc
 	Tagbilaran - Larena
 	Tagbilaran - Argao (formerly Loon-Argao that started in 1990, but was moved to Tagbilaran after a strong earthquake damaged the Port of Loon)
 	Samboan - Dapitan
 	Bato (Samboan, Cebu) - Sibulan
       Jagna - Cagayan de Oro
       Jagna - Nasipit 
       Plaridel - Larena
       Oslob, Cebu - Dipolog, launched in 2019
       Dumaguete - Cagayan de Oro

Incidents and accidents

Sister companies
These are the shipping companies of Lite Shipping:
 Danilo Lines, Incorporated
 Sunline Shipping Corporation
 Lirio Shipping Lines, Incorporated
 FAL Shipping Corporation
 Cebu Lite Trading, Inc.
 Manila Heavy Equipment Corporation
 Soledad Suites
 Brewpoint Coffee Club
 Casa Felomina
 Pamilacan Island Paradise
 Bohol Yacht Club, Inc.
 Bohol Community Cable TV Systems, Inc.
 Bohol Pensioners Financing Corporation
 Next Models Management Inc.
 Lite Properties Corporation

References

See also
Montenegro Lines
Trans-Asia Shipping Lines
Roble Shipping Inc.
Aleson Shipping Lines

Shipping companies of the Philippines
Companies based in Cebu City